Rattlesnake: The Ahanna Story soundtrack is an album produced by Larry Gaaga. It is the official soundtrack album of the movie Rattlesnake: The Ahanna Story.

Background 
The 8-track album has a running time of 29 minutes, with production from Puffy T, Masterkraft, Marvio and Richie. The album features Davido, Patoranking, 2Baba, Umu Obiligbo, Sound Sultan, Mazi Floss, D'banj, Uzikwendu, Magnito, Zoro, Acetune, Mr Chyke, Waga G, Slow Dogg, Marvio, and Sugarbana.

Singles 
Larry Gaaga released "Doubting Thomas" featuring Davido and Umu Obiligbo as a single.

Reception 

Motolani Alake of Pulse Ng rated the album 8.0/10, adding that the album is arguably the best posse cut Nigerian hip hop has seen in 2020.

Track listing

See also 
 Rattlesnake: The Ahanna Story
 Living in Bondage: Breaking Free

References 

2020 soundtrack albums
Albums by Nigerian artists